Sapphires, previously known as V Team, were an English women's cricket team that competed in the Super Fours. The squad varied from season to season, but was made up of some of the top players in English cricket. They were captained by various England players, such as Clare Taylor, Laura Newton and Heather Knight. They won seven Super Fours titles in their history: three 50-over tournaments and four Twenty20 tournaments.

History

2002–2005: V Team
The Super Fours was established in 2002 as a way of bridging the gap between women's county cricket and international cricket, bringing together the top players in England. V Team was one of the teams established, and was captained by Clare Taylor. They finished 3rd in the first 50 over tournament that took place, winning 3 out of 6 games. After finished 4th in 2003, V Team quickly became a strong side in the Super Fours, winning both the 50 over and the newly-established Twenty20 tournament in 2004. They won the Twenty20 tournament again a year later in 2005, going unbeaten to top the group.

2006–2013: Sapphires
In 2006 the team was renamed Sapphires and continued their form, winning their second 50 over title, with batter Claire Taylor finishing the season as leading run-scorer. They claimed another 50 over title in 2008, as well as two more Twenty20 titles, in 2011 and 2013. Sapphires therefore ended the Super Fours as the most successful side, with 7 titles.

Seasons

Super Fours

Super Fours Twenty20

References

2002 establishments in England
Super Fours teams